Franklin Clarke (February 7, 1934 – July 25, 2018) was an American football wide receiver in the National Football League (NFL) for the Cleveland Browns and Dallas Cowboys. He played college football at the University of Colorado.

Early years
Clarke was named after Franklin D. Roosevelt, the 32nd President of the United States. He attended Beloit Memorial High School where he received All-state honors in football and track. He clocked 49.9 seconds in the 440-yard dash.

After attending Trinidad State Junior College for two years, where he had a successful career, he became the first African-American varsity football player at the University of Colorado at Boulder, joining the Buffaloes in September 1954. He had to sit out the season after transferring. He was joined by John Wooten the following year and because this was before the civil rights movement, the pair often had to endure open racism outside of Boulder.

As a junior, he was an honorable-mention All-Big 7 conference performer, when he was second in the league with 407 receiving yards, during a run-oriented era. He also returned kickoffs, while leading the team with 13 receptions and 5 receiving touchdowns.

As a senior, he led the team with 7 receptions for 124 yards and 2 receiving touchdowns. Trailing 13–0 against the University of Missouri and needing a tie or a win to clinch a berth for the 1957 Orange Bowl, Clarke scored 2 second half touchdowns. Clemson University originally stated that they would not play in the bowl against a team with black athletes, but later changed its position and would end up losing 27–21. He was selected to play in the Copper Bowl All-Star game.

Clarke amassed 20 receptions for 532 yards (26.6 yard average), 7 receiving touchdowns and 2 blocked kicks, ending his career fifth at the time in receiving yards at Colorado. He was so well liked among his peers on campus, that he was chosen as King of the annual Days festival, Colorado's equivalent of Homecoming King. He also practiced basketball and track.

In 2008, he was inducted into the Colorado Athletic Hall of Fame.

Professional career

Cleveland Browns
Clarke was selected by the Cleveland Browns in the fifth round (61st overall) of the 1956 NFL Draft. He played with the team for three seasons, from 1957 to 1959, even though he stood on the sidelines during the first two. He had a total of 10 catches during those three years at offensive right end and was left unprotected in the 1960 NFL Expansion Draft.

Dallas Cowboys
Clarke was selected by the Dallas Cowboys in the 1960 NFL Expansion Draft. His coaches at Colorado and Cleveland criticized his blocking, but the Cowboys were still intrigued by the 6-1, 215-pound player. Instead of picking at his deficiencies, Tom Landry chose to accentuate his strengths. The coach appreciated his speed, soft hands and his ability to run precise routes, so he was converted into a split end. Mostly a backup behind Billy Howton and Fred Dugan, he appeared in 8 games (3 starts), registering 9 receptions, 290 yards, 3 touchdowns and a 32.2-yard average.

He moved into the starting role in 1961, tallying 41 receptions, 919 yards, 22.4-yard average (led the league), 9 touchdowns and scored 54 points (led the team). Additionally, he began a streak of seven consecutive games with at least a touchdown reception, which still stands as a Cowboys record shared with Bob Hayes (1965–1966), Terrell Owens (2007), and Dez Bryant (2012).

He turned out to be the Cowboys' first bona fide long-ball threat—before "Bullet" Bob Hayes joined him. Hayes even credits Clarke for teaching him the proper way to catch "the bomb"—the long pass. He is also credited as the first African American star athlete, on a Cowboys that played in a then racially divided Dallas.

In 1962, His opening day performance against the Washington Redskins was one for the ages. His 10 receptions for 241 yards, remains the best opening day performance in terms of most yards receiving, of any wide receiver in the history of the NFL. On September 23, Clarke was part of an infamous play where, for the first time in an NFL game, points were awarded for a penalty. The Cowboys were holding in the end zone on a 99-yard touchdown pass from Eddie LeBaron to Clarke, and the Pittsburgh Steelers were awarded a safety, helping them win the game 30–28. He was close to breaking the NFL season touchdown receiving record until missing the last 2 games with an injury.
That year would be his best, becoming the first player in team history to gain more than 1,000 yards in a season (ground or air) and recording 47 passes for career high numbers in yards (1043) and touchdowns (14). In addition to leading the NFL with 14 touchdowns and a 22.2-yard average per reception.

In 1964, he caught 65 passes (franchise record) for 973 yards, 5 touchdowns and received All-Pro honors.

In 1965, he was moved to tight end and was second on the team with 41 receptions for 682 yards and 4 touchdowns. In 1965, he was a backup to Pettis Norman, but remained productive and became a clutch third down receiver, recording 26 receptions for 355 and 4 touchdowns. The next year, his production fell to 9 receptions for 119 yards. He announced his retirement on July 17, 1968.

Clarke led the Cowboys in yards and touchdowns from 1961 to 1964, and catches in 1963 and 1964. He held the franchise record for most touchdowns in a season by a receiver with 14 from his 1962 season, which stood for 45 years until 2007, when it was broken by Terrell Owens. He also had the team record for the most career receiving multi-touchdown games with 9, until it was broken by Dez Bryant in 2014.

He retired after the 1967 NFL Championship Game against the Green Bay Packers, in what is now known as the “Ice Bowl”, won by the Packers, 21–17. He left with most of the franchise's records for receiving, finishing with 281 receptions for 5,214 yards and 51 touchdowns in 140 NFL games, which ranks sixth in receiving yards in Dallas Cowboys history.

Broadcasting
Clarke began his career as a sportscaster for WFAA-TV (Channel 8). He became the first African American sports anchor in a Dallas television station and at CBS. On weekends, he anchored sports reports for WFAA-TV when not working NFL games for CBS.

Personal life
Clarke died on July 25, 2018 at the age of 84. 

He was Catholic, raised in the faith and passing it down to his children.

His nephew is former sheriff David Clarke of Milwaukee.

References

External links
 Dallas Cowboys Uncover New Pass Catching Ace In Flanker Frank Clarke

1934 births
2018 deaths
Sportspeople from Beloit, Wisconsin
Players of American football from Wisconsin
American football tight ends
American football wide receivers
Colorado Buffaloes football players
Colorado Buffaloes men's basketball players
Colorado Buffaloes men's track and field athletes
Cleveland Browns players
Dallas Cowboys players
National Football League announcers
American men's basketball players
African-American Catholics